Tour of Azerbaijan 2009 is the 24th round of Tour of Iran (Azerbaijan), which took between 15 May and 21 May 2009 in Iranian Azerbaijan and in the Autonomous Republic of Nakhichivan. The tour had 6 stages in which Ahad Kazemi from Iran won in first place in over all classification of the tour.

Stages of the tour

General classification

References

Tour of Azerbaijan (Iran)